Munderkingen is the smallest town in the district of Alb-Donau in Baden-Württemberg in Germany. It is situated on the Danube, 9 km southwest of Ehingen, and 31 km southwest of Ulm.

Buildings

Danube Bridge
The so-called "New Danube Bridge" 1893 was the first massive concrete arch bridge, which was built with an arch span of more than 50 m: Engineer Karl Leibbrand from Stuttgart was the builder, the work was carried out by the construction company Buck from Ehingen. The bridge was busted in World War II, on April 22, 1945, by retreating German engineering troops. Reconstruction began immediately after the war. In June 1948, the re-created Danube bridge was inaugurated by the occupying power of the French zone.

Old hospital
Built in 1889–90, the historicist building belongs to the townscape.

Transport

Munderkingen is served by the Ulm–Sigmaringen railway.

Daughters and sons of the town
 Thomas Sattelberger (born 1949), German manager and politician (FDP)
 Thomas Locher (born 1956), artist
 Meinrad Kneer (born 1970), jazz musician

References

Alb-Donau-Kreis
Populated places on the Danube
Württemberg